The Atlantic and Gulf Short Line Railroad originated in 1900 as a renaming of the Midville, Swainsboro and Red Bluff Railroad. This line was then sold to the Georgia and Florida Railway in 1907.

References

 

Defunct Georgia (U.S. state) railroads
Predecessors of the Southern Railway (U.S.)
Railway companies established in 1900
Railway companies disestablished in 1907